In mathematics, especially in the study of infinite groups, the Hirsch–Plotkin radical is a subgroup describing the normal nilpotent subgroups of the group. It was named by  after Kurt Hirsch and Boris I. Plotkin, who proved that the product of locally nilpotent groups remains locally nilpotent; this fact is a key ingredient in its construction.

The Hirsch–Plotkin radical is defined as the subgroup generated by the union of the normal locally nilpotent subgroups (that is, those normal subgroups such that every finitely generated subgroup is nilpotent).  The Hirsch–Plotkin radical is itself a locally nilpotent normal subgroup, so is the unique largest such. The Hirsch–Plotkin radical generalizes the Fitting subgroup to infinite groups.  Unfortunately the subgroup generated by the union of infinitely many normal nilpotent subgroups need not itself be nilpotent, so the Fitting subgroup must be modified in this case.

References

Functional subgroups
Infinite group theory